The 2001 NCAA Division I men's ice hockey tournament involved 12 schools playing in single-elimination play to determine the national champion of men's  NCAA Division I college ice hockey.

The final event was played at Pepsi Arena, Albany, New York. Boston College, coached by Jerry York, won its first national title since 1949 by defeating North Dakota, 3-2, in overtime on April 7 on a goal scored by sophomore forward Krys Kolanos just 4:43 into the extra session. The Eagles had advanced to the title game after a 4-2 victory over Michigan in one semifinal on April 5, while the national runners-up Fighting Sioux, coached by Dean Blais, shut out Michigan State, 2-0, in the other semifinal earlier that day.

BC, which finished the season with a record of 33-8-2, earned its first NCAA hockey crown in 52 years by besting the three schools that had eliminated it in the three previous Frozen Fours: Maine (1999); Michigan (1998) and; North Dakota (2000).

2001 was the first year in which the MAAC received an automatic bid into the NCAA tournament, with their representative being the Mercyhurst Lakers. Also, 2001 was the first year Frozen Four patches would debut and be worn by the final four teams.

Game locations

The NCAA Men's Division I Ice Hockey Championship is a single-elimination tournament featuring 12 teams representing five Division I conferences in the nation.  The Championship Committee seeds the entire field from 1 to 12 within two regionals of 6 teams. The winners of five Division I conference championships receive automatic bids to participate in the NCAA Championship. The top regional placements are given to the best teams from each of the two regions (East and West) while the remaining 10 teams are seeded based upon their rankings regardless of region.

Regional Sites
 East Regional – Centrum Centre, Worcester, Massachusetts
 West Regional – Van Andel Arena, Grand Rapids, Michigan

Championship Site
 Frozen Four – Pepsi Arena, Albany, New York

Qualifying teams
The at-large bids and seeding for each team in the tournament were announced after the conference tournaments concluded on March 17, 2001. The Western Collegiate Hockey Association (WCHA) had five teams receive a berth in the tournament, Hockey East had three teams receive a berth in the tournament, Central Collegiate Hockey Association (CCHA) had two berths, while the ECAC and the Metro Atlantic Athletic Conference (MAAC) each received one entry into the tournament, with the latter making its first appearance in the NCAA championship.

Number in parentheses denotes overall seed in the tournament.

Bracket

Regionals

Frozen Four

Note: * denotes overtime period(s)

Regional Quarterfinals

West Regional

(3) Michigan vs. (6) Mercyhurst

(4) Wisconsin vs. (5) Providence

East Regional

(3) Colorado College vs. (6) St. Lawrence

(4) Minnesota vs. (5) Maine

Regional semifinals

West Regional

(1) Michigan State vs. (4) Wisconsin

(2) St. Cloud State vs. (3) Michigan

East Regional

(1) Boston College vs. (5) Maine

(2) North Dakota vs. (3) Colorado College

Frozen Four

National semifinal

(W1) Michigan State vs. (E2) North Dakota

(E1) Boston College vs. (W3) Michigan

National Championship

(E1) Boston College vs. (W2) North Dakota

All-Tournament team
G: Scott Clemmensen (Boston College)
D: Travis Roche (North Dakota)
D: Rob Scuderi (Boston College)
F: Chuck Kobasew* (Boston College)
F: Krys Kolanos (Boston College)
F: Bryan Lundbohm (North Dakota)
* Most Outstanding Player(s)

Record by conference

References

Tournament
NCAA Division I men's ice hockey tournament
NCAA Men's Division Ice Hockey Tournament
NCAA Men's Division Ice Hockey Tournament
NCAA Men's Division Ice Hockey Tournament
NCAA Men's Division Ice Hockey Tournament
NCAA Men's Division Ice Hockey Tournament
Ice hockey competitions in Albany, New York
Events in Grand Rapids, Michigan
Ice hockey competitions in Worcester, Massachusetts
Ice hockey competitions in Michigan
Sports in Grand Rapids, Michigan